Nou Televisió, or simply Nou (Valencian for "nine" or "new"), previously known as Canal Nou ("Channel Nine" or "New Channel"), was a public television station in the Valencian Community, Spain. It was run by Radiotelevisió Valenciana (RTVV), which was operated from Burjassot, and operated from 9 October 1989 until November 29, 2013.

History

Broadcasting
It was broadcast in Valencian and Spanish and could be watched in the Valencian Community and adjacent areas, especially Catalonia and Murcia. The station broadcast in stereo, and it was often possible to watch programmes in dual language (original soundtrack and Valencian (or Spanish) dub).

Programming
The newscasts were divided into three issues of Notícies Nou and one morning, Bon Dia Comunitat Valenciana. It broadcast Valencian fiction series such as Negocis de Família, Les Moreres or L'Alqueria Blanca. It also broadcast soap operas, mainly of Mexican and Venezuelan production. It brings the news of the community closer together with En connexió and it also broadcast the football matches of the Valencian First Division teams, as well as the most important sporting events of different Valencian clubs, such as the Pamesa Valencia match of the ULEB Cup. The channel also had the rights to the matches of the Valencian Community football team.

It also had a children's space for children called Babala Club, a container for animated series.

In prime time, it used to broadcast self-produced programs, series, cinema and thematic programs, for example, cycles of certain actors. It also broadcast the space Check-in hotel, a sketch-comedy that had audience shares of up to 30% in the Valencian Community. Its largest audience and share data occurred at the time Tómbola was broadcast .

In addition, this channel was very involved with the Valencian festivities, with broadcasts of the Fallas de Valencia, as well as broadcasts of the Moors and Christians festivals of the Valencian cities of Onteniente and Alcoy, the Magdalena Festival, the Bonfires of Saint John and the Holy Week. However, these broadcasts were later broadcast by Nou 24, or half of an act at the channel and the other half in Nou 24.

Closure
In July 2012, in the middle of the ongoing financial crisis, RTVV announced a labor force adjustment plan, firing 1,198 of its 1,660 employees. Trade unions CCOO and CGT challenged the measure, and on 5 November 2013 it was nullified by the National Court. Claiming that reinstating the employees was untenable, the Generalitat Valenciana closed down RTVV that same day.

Logos

References

External links
Official website

Radiotelevisió Valenciana
Defunct television channels in Spain
Mass media in the Valencian Community
Catalan-language television stations
Television channels and stations established in 1989
Television channels and stations disestablished in 2013